Philodromus anomalus is a spider in the family Philodromidae ("running crab spiders"), in the infraorder Araneomorphae ("true spiders").
It is found in the USA.

References

anomalus
Spiders described in 1934